Harry Coupar Pye (10 August 1880 – 13 March 1953) was an Australian rules footballer who played with Carlton in the Victorian Football League (VFL).

Family
He married twice. He married his first wife, Minnie Brown (-1950), on 8 January 1908. They had two children. He married his second wife, Priscilla Humerston (1890-1968), in 1951, and became stepfather to her daughter.

Football

Carlton (VFL)
Recruited from a local church team, St Lukes, Pye played a total of 16 senior games for Carlton over two seasons: 14 games in 1901, and 2 games in 1902. He played in the first two matches in 1902 under new coach Jack Worrall, and then left the club — in round 3, Worrall made 8 changes (including new players) to the previous week's team, in which Pye had played his final match.

Brighton (VFA)
He was cleared from Carlton to Brighton Football Club in the Victorian Football Association (VFA) on 30 April 1906.

Death
He died at his residence in St Kilda on 13 March 1953.

Notes

References

External links 
 
 
 Harry Pye's profile at Blueseum
 Harry Pye's profile at The VFA Project

1880 births
1953 deaths
Australian rules footballers from Victoria (Australia)
Carlton Football Club players